Erga Edizioni, is a publishing company situated in Genova (Italy). It was founded on 1964 by Marcello Merli.

History
Erga started publishing some books about the history and culture of Genova. Over time his production embraced much more areas of interest, from oriental to occidental philosophy, nutrition, food, free time, tourism, architecture and many other. Among others, Roberto G.Colombo is one of the authors that have published books with Erga.

Music
Starting on 2008 Erga Editions has published also many music CD. It released over 20 titles till yet, between them Sandro Giacobbe - 35 anni di successi, Perseo Miranda - A silence that screams, and many classic music cd as Nabucco (Giuseppe Verdi)

References

External links

Publishing companies established in 1964
Magazine publishing companies of Italy
Book publishing companies of Italy
Mass media in Genoa
Italian companies established in 1964
Companies based in Genoa